The Creston Subdivision is a railroad line owned by CSX Transportation in the U.S. State of South Carolina. At its north end it continues south from the Orangeburg Subdivision and at its south end it continues south as Norfolk Southern.

See also
 List of CSX Transportation lines

References

CSX Transportation lines
Rail infrastructure in South Carolina